"Narcos" is a song by Puerto Rican rapper Anuel AA  and was released on May 29, 2020, as the sixth single from his second studio album Emmanuel.

Music video
The video was released on June 25, 2020, and has received over 200 million views on YouTube. It It was directed by Mike Ho, with studio parts and outdoor parts, in which Anuel teaches his fans to do the famous choreography "El Baile del Dinero".

Charts

Weekly charts

Year-end charts

Certifications

References

2020 singles